Stíny v mlze is a 2022 crime drama television series by Czech Television. The premiere on ČT1 screens took place on 3 January 2022. The series was directed by Radim Špaček and the script was written by Zdeněk Zapletal. It consists of 12 episodes, each presenting a different case from Ostrava and its surroundings. The main roles of the investigators were played by Petra Špalková, Jiří Vyorálek and Petr Panzenberger. The daughter of Petra Špalková's character was played by Anděla Tichá, the real daughter of the actress.

Cast

Main
 Petra Špalková as Magda Malá
 Jiří Vyorálek as Martin Černý
 Jaroslav Plesl as Pavel Malý
 Regina Rázlová as Karolína Malá
 Anděla Tichá as Amálka Malá
 Tomáš Mrvík as Filip Černý
 Miroslav Hanuš as Jan Hrbek
 Petr Panzenberger as Jarek Kucharčik
 David Viktora as Jiří Tomek
 Patrik Kříž as Radek
 Tomáš Havlínek as Jindřich Staněk
 Veronika Lapková as Jolana Gábová
 Ondřej Brett as analyst Milan
 Vít Roleček as analyst Jan
 Vladislav Georgiev as medical examiner Bláha
 Jakub Vaverka as Mustafa
 Marek Cisovský as mjr. Svatoš

Episodes

References

External links 
Official site
IMDB site
ČSFD site

Czech crime television series
2022 Czech television series debuts
Czech Television original programming